Victory Day over Nazism in World War II or simply Victory Day is a national holiday and a non-working day in Ukraine. It was first celebrated on 9 May 2015 and follows the Day of Remembrance and Reconciliation on 8 May (which pays tribute to the victims of World War II and was also first celebrated in 2015). The holiday replaced Victory Day, which is celebrated in other post-Soviet states.

In February 2023 a bill was submitted to parliament to abolish 9 May as a public holiday.

Differences from Russia's Victory Day
On April 9th, 2015, the Ukrainian parliament approved a set of decommunization laws which included the annulment of the Soviet law commonly cited as the "Law of Perpetuation of the Great Patriotic War of 1941-1945", which had established Victory Day as a Ukrainian holiday. The holiday was replaced with a new holiday, officially named "Victory Day over Nazism in World War II". 

According to Ukraine's decommunization laws, both Communist and Nazi symbols have been prohibited in Ukraine since May 15th, 2015, which means that Soviet symbols may not be used during the celebration of this holiday. The term "Great Patriotic War" was itself removed from all official Ukrainian legislation shortly after the change of holiday, and, while not illegal, the phrase "Great Patriotic War" is rarely used due to its frequent use by the USSR, and later, the Russian Federation, with Ukrainian institutions preferring the phrase "World War II".

Ukraine has also worked to shift the narrative of the holiday away from a glorification of war and conflict and instead to "celebrate personal histories", with an aim to "honor, rather than celebrate" the events of the war, in a manner more similar to the United Kingdom's Remembrance Day than to Russia's Victory Day.

Celebrations by year

2015 
The Ukrainian Institute of National Memory have published teaching materials in advance and recommended the holiday be celebrated in a new format. Despite the fact that the law "About perpetuation of the victory over Nazism in World War II 1939 - 1945" officially did not came into force, the holiday in Ukraine officially was celebrated in a format different from Russian formats of celebration of "Victory Day". On this day there were ceremony of laying flowers at monuments to unknown soldiers of the Red Army, in Kyiv - a peace march involving military brass bands from Ukraine, Estonia, Jordan, Lithuania, Poland, and Serbia. It was after the ceremony of oath of cadets in the presence of the President of Ukraine Petro Poroshenko.

The day before, Poroshenko delivered a speech to a Verkhovna Rada filled with veterans of the Red Army, the Ukrainian Insurgent Army, Anti-Terrorist Operation veterans, as well as former presidents of Ukraine (Leonid Kravchuk, Leonid Kuchma and Viktor Yushchenko) and Secretary-General of the United Nations Ban Ki-Moon.

For this memorable day the President of Ukraine established a state award by his order - the anniversary Medal "70 Years of Victory over Nazism".

2016
2016 was the first year that the holiday was celebrated as an official holiday (although the first celebrations took place the year before, the law establishing the holiday was adopted a couple days after 9 May).

2017
More than 30,000 police officers were deployed to monitor holiday marches. The 72nd anniversary celebrations coincides with the ceremonies for the Eurovision Song Contest in Kyiv.

2019
President-elect Volodymyr Zelensky arranged a meeting in Zaporizhia of a veteran Red Army Captain and a veteran of the Ukrainian Insurgent Army.

2020
The 2020 celebrations in honor of the diamond jubilee were cancelled by order of Prime Minister Denys Shmyhal in light of the COVID-19 pandemic in Ukraine. On 7 May, Mayor of Kyiv Vitali Klitschko announced the organization of a planned event in the Park of Eternal Glory with a high security presence. President Zelensky went on a working visit to the Luhansk Oblast where he visited an urban settlement that is divided by the border between Ukraine and Russia. In the settlement, he visited the memorial complex "Ukraine to the Liberators". He also visited the Zakarpattia Oblast, where he also laid flowers at the "Hill of Glory" memorial complex. During his holiday address on 9 May, he paid tribute to Ukrainians who fought during the war, including Crimean Tatar Amet-Khan Sultan, American military personnel Alex M. Diachenko and Michael Strank, as well as Hero of the Soviet Union Ivan Kozhedub. Zelensky also announced the creation of memorial project, which would involve the placement of bells in the four corners of Ukraine.

Symbols 
The official symbol of celebration of Victory Day over Nazism in World War II and Day of Remembrance and Reconciliation is red poppy (remembrance poppy) flower, which is the world common symbol of memorable days of World War II. It is used in Ukraine in its own styling developed by Kharkiv designer Sergei Mishakin. The motto of both days is "1939—1945. We remember. We prevail".

See also
Liberation Day (Ukraine)
Time of Remembrance and Reconciliation for Those Who Lost Their Lives during the Second World War

References

Sources

Official Website
Project of bill "On perpetuation of the victory over Nazism in World War II in 1939 — 1945" . Verkhovna Rada of Ukraine.

Public holidays in Ukraine
Ukrainian culture
Society of Ukraine
2015 establishments in Ukraine
May observances
Spring (season) events in Ukraine
Recurring events established in 2015